Aleksandr Kovalevsky (born 18 May 1974) is a Kyrgyzstani former wrestler who competed in the 1996 Summer Olympics and in the 2000 Summer Olympics.

References

External links
 

1974 births
Living people
Olympic wrestlers of Kyrgyzstan
Wrestlers at the 1996 Summer Olympics
Wrestlers at the 2000 Summer Olympics
Kyrgyzstani male sport wrestlers
Kyrgyzstani people of Russian descent